Saudek is a Czech surname. Notable people with the surname include:

Jan Saudek (born 1935), Czech photographer; brother of Kája Saudek
Kája Saudek (1935–2015), Czech comics illustrator; brother of Jan Saudek
Robert Saudek (1880–1935), Czech graphologist and writer
Robert Saudek (television executive) (1911–1997), American TV producer and executive

See also
Sudek (disambiguation)
Soudek

Czech-language surnames